The 350th Spectrum Warfare Wing is an active United States Air Force organization.  It was activated in 2021 at Eglin Air Force Base, Florida.  The wing is responsible for delivering electromagnetic spectrum capabilities to 69 United States and foreign electromagnetic warfare systems. Additionally, the wing is responsible for electromagnetic warfare reprogramming, modeling and simulation and assessments.

Previously, as the 350th Electronic Systems Wing it developed, acquired, fielded, and sustained systems for C2, ISR and communication capabilities for Air Force, joint and coalition operations. It serviced five major commands, three U.S. services, seven combatant commanders, three national agencies, NORAD and NATO. The 350th executed $14 billion in programs.

History
The 350th Spectrum Warfare Wing, formerly the Command and Control, Intelligence, Surveillance and Reconnaissance Systems Wing, traces its history back to the early establishment of information superiority in the United States Army Air Forces. The newly defined role of the aircraft for reconnaissance purposes resulted in the birth of multiple observation groups in the Army Air Forces.

World War II
The 26th Observation Group, the direct predecessor of the 350th, was activated 1 September 1941, and assigned to the First Air Force. The group, stationed at Fort Devens, Massachusetts, flew various types of missions, including photographic, reconnaissance, tow target, and coast artillery spotting. This was done in cooperation with units along the Eastern seaboard.

The group was later redesignated the 26th Reconnaissance Group, and took part in the Carolina and Tennessee Maneuvers in the fall of 1941 and 1942 in support of Army field training exercises. In both exercises, observation aircraft were used to detail strategic ground positioning and provide an opportunity to train senior commanders and staff in the operational elements of combat.

With Pearl Harbor deeply entrenched in the minds of military leaders, it was clear there was a greater need for coastal surveillance and anti-submarine patrols. The 26th Reconnaissance Group, stationed out of Reading Army Air Field, Pennsylvania, was given that responsibility for the northeastern North American sector of the Atlantic Ocean.

Various aircraft, including the Douglas O-46 and Curtiss O-52 Owl, flew antisubmarine patrols off the East Coast after the United States entered World War II. Other more notable aircraft that flew reconnaissance missions with modifications to their existing frames included the Bell P-39 Airacobra and North American B-25 Mitchell, which was designated as the F-10 after being modified for photographic reconnaissance work.  The group was disbanded at the end of 1943

Air Force reserve
The 26th Reconnaissance Group was reestablished as a reserve organization in 1947 near Buffalo. New York and was inactivated on 27 June 1949, when Continental Air Command implemented the wing base organization (Hobson Plan) for its reserve organizations.  It was redesignated the 350th Tactical Electronics Group in 1985, but remained in inactive status.

Systems development
The group was redesignated as the 350th Electronics Systems Wing, delivering and sustaining transformational capabilities for operational-level command, control, intelligence, surveillance and reconnaissance information dominance.

The 350th Electronics Systems Group, formerly the Operational Command and Control Systems Group, acquired and sustained operational-level command and control assets including the Air and Space Operations Center and Theater Battle Management Core Systems.

The 850th Electronic Systems Group, formerly the Combatant Commanders Command and Control Systems Group, acquired, fielded and sustained global sensing, communication and decision-making capabilities, including missile warning and defense sensors, global command and control systems, space control sensors and battle management systems.

The 950th Electronic Systems Group, formerly the Intelligence Surveillance and Reconnaissance Group, developed, acquired, and integrated network-centric intelligence, surveillance, and reconnaissance information and decision-support systems to fuse data at multiple security levels for Air Force, joint and coalition warfighters. The 950th ELSG was recognized with the AF Outstanding Unit Award for the period of 1 April 2006 to 31 March 2008.

Lineage
 350th Tactical Electronic Group
 Constituted as the 26th Observation Group on 21 August 1941
 Activated on 1 September 1941
 Redesignated 26th Reconnaissance Group on 2 April 1943
 Redesignated 26th Tactical Reconnaissance Group on 11 August 1943.
 Disbanded on 11 November 1943
 Reconstituted and redesignated 26th Reconnaissance Group
 Activated in the reserve on 23 October 1947
 Inactivated on 27 June 1949
 Redesignated 350th Tactical Electronic Group on 31 July 1985
 Consolidated with the Command and Control, Intelligence, Surveillance and Reconnaissance Wing on 6 April 2006 as the Command and Control, Intelligence, Surveillance and Reconnaissance Wing

 350th Spectrum Warfare Wing
 Constituted as the Command and Control, Intelligence, Surveillance and Reconnaissance Wing on 23 November 2004
 Activated on 17 December 2004
 Consolidated with the 350th Tactical Electronic Group on 6 April 2006
 Redesignated 350th Electronic Systems Wing on 17 April 2006
 Inactivated on 30 June 2010
 Redesignated 350th Spectrum Warfare Wing 
 Activated 25 June 2021

Assignments
 First Air Force, 1 September 1941
 Third Air Force, unknown – 11 November 1943
 Electronic Systems Center, 17 December 2004 – 30 June 2010
 United States Air Force Warfare Center, 25 June 2021
 Sixteenth Air Force unknown – present

Components
 Groups
 Operational Command and Control Systems Group (later 350th Electronic Systems Group), 17 December 2004 – 30 June 2010
 Combatant Commanders Command and Control Systems Group (later 850th Electronic Systems Group, 850th Spectrum Warfare), 17 December 2004 – 30 June 2010, c. 25 June 2021 - present
 Intelligence Surveillance and Reconnaissance Group (later 950th Electronic Systems Group), 17 December 2004 – 30 June 2010
 350th Spectrum Warfare Group, c. 25 June 2021 - present
 850th Electronic Systems Group (later 850th Spectrum Warfare Group): see Combatant Commanders Command and Control Systems Group
 950th Electronic Systems Group: see Intelligence Surveillance and Reconnaissance Group

 Squadrons
 4th Reconnaissance Squadron: 23 October 1947 – 27 June 1949
 10th Reconnaissance Squadron: 6 November 1947– 27 June 1949
 14th Observation Squadron: 29 March 1942 – 7 March 1943
 72d Liaison Squadron: 11 April – 11 August 1943
 91st Reconnaissance Squadron (later 91st Tactical Reconnaissance Squadron), 17 June – 11 August 1943, 23 August – 9 October 1943
 101st Observation Squadron (later 101st Reconnaissance Squadron, 101st Tactical Reconnaissance Squadron, 101st Photographic Mapping Squadron): 1 September 1941 – 9 October 1943
 103d Observation Squadron  (later 103d Reconnaissance Squadron, 103d Tactical Reconnaissance Squadron): attached 23 December 1941, assigned 29 March 1942 – 21 October 1943
 152d Observation Squadron  (later 152d Reconnaissance Squadron): 1 September 1941 – 27 June 1943

Stations
 Ayer Army Air Field, Massachusetts, 1 September 1941
 Hillsgrove Army Air Field, Rhode Island, c. 12 September 1941
 Naval Air Station Quonset Point, Rhode Island, Jun 1942
 Hyannis Army Air Field, Massachusetts, July 1942
 Middletown Air Depot, Pennsylvania, Sep 1942
 Reading Army Air Field, Pennsylvania,  – 11 November 1943
 Bell Modification Center, New York, 23 October 1947
 Buffalo Airport, New York, C. 17 February 1948 – 27 June 1949
 Hanscom Air Force Base, Massachusetts, 17 December 2004 – 30 June 2010
 Eglin Air Force Base, Florida, c. 25 June 2021 - present

Aircraft

 Douglas O-46, 1941–1943
 North American O-47, 1941–1943
 Curtiss O-52 Owl, 1941–1943
 Piper L-4 Grasshopper, 1941–1943
 Douglas A-20 Havoc, 1941–1943
 North American B-25 Mitchell, 1941–1943
 Bell P-39 Airacobra, 1941–1943

References

Notes
 Explanatory notes

 Citations

Bibliography

External links
 Hanscom AFB Website
 Hansconian Article about 350 ELSW
 U.S. Air Force Fact Sheet 350 ELECTRONIC SYSTEMS WING (AFMC)
 Air Force activates first spectrum warfare wing, 29 June 2021.
 

Wings of the United States Air Force
Electronic warfare units and formations
Military units and formations established in 2021